Burnchurch is a civil parish in Shillelogher, County Kilkenny, Ireland.

Etymology

The name of the parish derives from the townland of Burnchurch situated within the parish. The townland itself was originally named after the early Irish church founded there in the 6th century by Saint Dallán Forgaill. The original name of the church was Cill Dalláin, meaning 'The Church of Dallán'. The Irish name was later corrupted into different spellings such as Kiltranyn, Kiltranen, Kyltranyn, Kiltranye and Kiltranyheyn. Kiltrani seemes to be the earliest surviving mention in 1225. After the Norman invasion of Ireland the parish was granted to the Fitzmaurice family. St Dallán's feast day is held on 29 January and the feast was certainly kept there in medieval times, as a document (No. 81) in the Calendar of Ormond Deeds dated 1429 states- Richard Horihan quit-claims to John, son of Richard Tobyn of Barlesky, all claim in all his messuages, lands and tenements in Kylamery to him and his heirs for ever. Given on the feast of St. Dallan in the 7th year of Henry VI. January 29, 1429. Seal. Barlesky and Kylamery are corruptions of the modern townlands of Caherlesk and Killamery in the adjoining parishes of Ballytobin and Killamery. There is a Holy Well in the middle of Burnchurch townland named 'Tobar San Dallán' (St. Dallan's Well) in honour of the saint. The Roman Catholic Bishop of Ossory Diocese, James Phelan (1669-1695), wrote a list of patrons of the different parishes in the diocese and stated that a pattern was held at Dallán's well annually for the week commencing 31 July (probably because the weather was warmer then rather than holding it on the feast day of the saint). 
 
According to Fr. Stephen Barron in his article 'Distinguished Waterford Families', published in "The Journal of the Waterford Archaeological Society" 
(Vol. XVII, 1914, page 54) King Robert the Bruce burned Kiltranyn in 1316 and after that it was henceforth known as Burnchurch (in Gaelic 'Teampall Loiscthe' = "The Incinerated Church". In Latin it was named Ecclesia Cremata and Ecclesia Combusta), but there is lack of documentary evidence for this burning. The earliest mention of the name Burnchurch dates from the beginning of the 15th century.

Townlands

The townlands of Burnchurch civil parish are-
 
Ballymack (Desart); Ballymack (Flood); Ballyroberts; Booly; Burnchurch; Burnchurch Viper; Coalsfarm; Farmley; Graigue Lower; Graigue Upper; Newlands; Oldtown; Paddock; Sunhill and Washers Bog.

References

External links
 Saint Dallán Forgaill (c.560 -c.640), alias Eochaid Éices

Civil parishes of County Kilkenny

Church organization
Church of Ireland